Statistics of Bahraini Premier League for the 1987–88 season.

Overview
Muharraq Club won the championship.

References
RSSSF

Bahraini Premier League seasons
Bah
1987–88 in Bahraini football